Stuart Irwin McGee (1930–2013) was an eminent Anglican priest.

McGee was educated at Trinity College, Dublin and ordained deacon in 1953 and priest in 1954. After  curacies in Belfast and Singapore he was the incumbent at  Ballintra from 1958 to 1965. He was a Chaplain to the Forces from 1965 to 1988, latterly as Assistant Chaplain General. He was at Tubbercurry from 1988 until his appointment as Dean of Elphin and Ardagh in  1992. He retired in post in 1999.

References

20th-century Irish Anglican priests
21st-century Irish Anglican priests
Deans of Elphin and Ardagh
Alumni of Trinity College Dublin
Royal Army Chaplains' Department officers
1930 births
2013 deaths